The Matchmaker Stakes is a Grade III American Thoroughbred horse race for fillies and mares age three and older run over a distance of  miles on the turf held annually in July at Monmouth Park Racetrack in Oceanport, New Jersey.

History

The inaugural running of the event was on 30 September 1967 at Atlantic City Race Course over a distance of  miles on the dirt. The event concept was that additional stakes offered for the event were given to the owners for payment to breed to selected sires. The first running  attracted 14 entrants and the three sires that were available for the placegetters were the 1958 US Horse of the Year Round Table, 1960 US Champion Two-Year-Old Colt Hail To Reason and the 1962 Belmont Stakes winner Jaipur. The winner of the inaugural race was the Maryland bred mare Politely who set a new track record of 1:55. Politely would win the event again the following year.

In the early years of the event in the attracted the finest mares as owners vied for the possibility of breeding to former champions that were offered as part of prizemoney. In 1973 when The American Graded Stakes Committee was founded by the Thoroughbred Owners and Breeders Association the event was immediately given the highest classification of Grade I.

In 1978 the event was moved to be run on the turf track. In 1979 the event was downgraded to Grade II. 

In 1997 with diminished racing dates given to the Atlantic City Race Course the event was moved to Monmouth Park. The distance of the event was decreased to  miles. Also that year the event was downgraded once more to Grade III. Since 2004, the event has beene part of the Haskell Invitational day meeting.

In 2009, the Matchmaker was taken off the turf because of heavy rain in New Jersey earlier in the day. Originally carded as a Grade III event, the Matchmaker lost its graded status for that running in a decision made by the American Graded Stakes Committee shortly after it was run.

Taylor Made Stallions sponsored the Matchmaker from 2005 to 2012. The event has been supported by WinStar Farm since 2014.

Records
Speed record:  
 miles (turf) –  1:46.19  Batique  (2001)
 miles (turf) – 1:53.40 Sabin (1984) & Spruce Fir (1989)
 miles (dirt) – 1:54.20 Susan's Girl (1975) & Mississippi Mud (1977)

Margins: 
 7 lengths – Gallant Bloom (1969) & Captain's Lover (2009)

Most wins:
 2 – Politely (1967, 1968)
 2 – Starstruck (2013, 2014)

Most wins by trainer:
 6 – Chad C. Brown (2015, 2017, 2018, 2020, 2021, 2022)

Most wins by a jockey:
 4 – Joe Bravo (1999, 2003, 2008, 2016)

Most wins by owner:
 2 – Bohemia Stable (1967, 1968)
 2 – Augustin Stable (1994, 1996)
 2 – Calumet Farm (2013, 2014)

Winners

Legend:

 
 

Notes:

§ Ran as an entry

‡ Originally the event was scheduled for Friday, 10 August 1979, but an electrical storm forced the cancellation of the meeting and the event was redrawn and held on Wednesday, 15 August 1979.

† In the 1983 Alma North was first past the post but was disqualified for interference of the third place finisher Honestous and Numbered Account was declared the winner, Honestous was placed second and Alma North moved to third.

See also
 List of American and Canadian Graded races

References

Graded stakes races in the United States
Grade 3 stakes races in the United States
Horse races in New Jersey
Turf races in the United States
Mile category horse races for fillies and mares
Monmouth Park Racetrack
Atlantic City Race Course
1967 establishments in New Jersey